Ekedalen is a locality situated in Tidaholm Municipality, Västra Götaland County, Sweden with 483 inhabitants in 2020.

References 

Populated places in Västra Götaland County
Populated places in Tidaholm Municipality